Jeff Pamplin (born 4 November 1973) is an Irish bobsledder. He competed in the two man and the four man events at the 1998 Winter Olympics.

References

External links
 

1973 births
Living people
Irish male bobsledders
Olympic bobsledders of Ireland
Bobsledders at the 1998 Winter Olympics
Place of birth missing (living people)